Early legislative elections were held in New Caledonia on 29 September 1985. They were called after the 1984 elections had been boycotted by the pro-independence Kanak and Socialist National Liberation Front (FLNKS) and were marred by violence that continued for several weeks after election day.

Following an agreement reached between the French government and pro- and anti-independence groups, New Caledonia was split into four regions, each with its own Assembly, with the members of the four assemblies uniting to form the territorial Congress, which replaced the Territorial Assembly.

The FLNKS won a majority in three of the four regional assemblies, with the Caldoche-backed Rally for Caledonia in the Republic (RPCR) won a large majority in the Nouméa  region. However, with the South region having by far the largest population, the RCPR received 61% of the total vote across the territory and won 26 of the 46 seats in Congress, with the FLNKS winning 16.

Campaign
Several French prominent politicians visited the territory during the election campaign to support the RPCR, including Jacques Chirac and Francois Leotard of the Rally for the Republic, Jean-Marie Le Pen of the National Front and Gaston Flosse, president of French Polynesia.

Conduct
Although election day was violence-free, a bomb was detonated at the Land Office and Office for the Development of the Interior and the Islands in Nouméa on the day before.

Results

By region

Aftermath
The regional assemblies convened on 6 October to elect their presidents; Léopold Jorédié (FLNKS) was elected in the Central region, Yeiwéné Yeiwéné (FLNKS) in the Loyalty Islands, Jean-Marie Tjibaou (FLNKS) in North region and Jean Lèques (RPCR) in the South region. Two days later Dick Ukeiwé was elected President of the Congress, defeating Tjibaou by 29 votes to 13.

References

Notes

New Caledonia
Elections in New Caledonia
1985 in New Caledonia
New Caledonia